The following are the national records in Olympic weightlifting in Kiribati. Records are maintained in each weight class for the snatch lift, clean and jerk lift, and the total for both lifts by the Kiribati Weightlifting Association.

Current records

Men

Women

Historical records

Men (1998–2018)

Women (1998–2018)

References

External links

Kiribati
Kiribati
Olympic weightlifting
Weightlifting